Hematite is an unincorporated community in eastern Jefferson County, Missouri, United States. It is located approximately seven miles northeast of De Soto.

Hematite was platted in 1861. The community was named for nearby deposits of hematite. A post office called Hematite has been in operation since 1858, and the United Nuclear Corporation's reactor fuel production plant operated in the area from 1957 until 2001.

Notes

Unincorporated communities in Jefferson County, Missouri
Unincorporated communities in Missouri
Populated places established in 1861
1861 establishments in Missouri